The Intimidator (or Timmy for short) is an electropneumatic paintball marker that was manufactured by former professional paintball player Bob Long and his company, Bob Long Technologies. 

Introduced in 2000, it was, along with the Smart Parts Impulse, one of the first fully electropneumatic markers to be adopted by professional tournament teams on a widespread basis. There are over 28 versions of the Intimidator, spread over six "generations."

Bob Long Technologies was later sold to Eric Crandall in 2017.

Team Dynasty shoots Bob Long now known as Field One. The newest marker out of the factory is the Field One Force which is based on Bob Long’s NG Insight with newly designed parts from Field One.

History 
The Intimidator was developed and tested by Bob Long, and manufactured in the United States. The marker was tested using computer controlled shooting machines and ballistic chronographs, invented to test machine guns. 

In 2004, Bob Long introduced the Alias Intimidator. The marker was redesigned from the ground up. Features like the regulator and valve were made smaller to increase flow and lower the pressure of the marker. The LCD was moved from the top of the trigger frame to the grip frame, and the internals were modified so that it cycled faster. As a result of these modifications, the Alias was more compact than the original Intimidator, and about 20% more air efficient. This version of the Intimidator served at the basis for all subsequent markers under the Intimidator name until 2006 when the Generation 4 Intimidators were released. 

At the peak of its popularity in the mid-2000s, the Intimidator saw use in national and international tournament play. Its popularity began to decline however in later years as other poppet valve markers with similar rates of fire (such as the Planet Eclipse Ego) became available. As a comparison a brand new Bob Long Vice Intimidator retails from the company at $749.99 USD whereas the Planet Eclipse Etek3 (aluminum body style) and Planet Eclipse Ego 9 retails at the company's site at $595 and $1,095 USD respectively. Nonetheless, the Intimidator can still be seen in use today at many paintball fields.

Generation 5 Intimidators were made in two body styles: the Vice marker and the Protege, the former being the more expensive and in some ways more refined high-end version. The Vice came with a Tadao board stock as well as a lever lock feedneck, a pillow bolt and more intricate milling. Generation 5 markers are four-eye capable which is a Bob Long design to incorporate four breakbeam eyes rather than the usual two. This design is intended to improve the reaction time of the board and bolt. Generation 5 markers are also in the category of very light guns weighing in at 1 lb. 13.2oz without a barrel. 

Some aftermarket upgrades designed specifically for the Generation 5 markers are the Yakuza OLED board made by Tadao technologies which offers a screen to change modes instead of using the stock flashing LED and adds numerous new parameters to change, including the ability to set up multiple preset fire modes and adjust rate of fire by intervals of 0.1bps.  a low pressure poppet which uses a slightly longer shaft to open the valve for a slightly longer time and more air as it cycles to create a softer shot by reducing recoil, it also reduces recoil to small degree. The aforementioned 4C eye and laser 4C eye systems which uses two additional sensors to calculate the amount of time it takes for a ball to be fully loaded into the breach and tells the board to pre-charge the solenoid. This helps increase rate of fire in semi-auto and allows for more uniform streams of paint. Protege users can buy the same pillow bolt that comes stock in the Vice from Bob Long Direct; it uses a rubber insert in the bolt face to put less pressure on the paintball being fired and to prevent paint from breaking inside the barrel. Lurker paintball makes an adjustable ram for the Gen 5 markers to help reduce recoil and lower dwell, thus increasing efficiency. Lurker rams have a cult following within the Intimidator owning and collecting community. 

Generation 6 intimidators are the first non-macro line, stacked tube marker. Named the G6r, the marker was released in 2011. This model was the standard edition. Bob Long Manufactures released a 2012 edition. This edition was upgraded with a cam-drive ASA, a Frenzy OLED board, and new through air passage ways, with a new pricetag of $999.99.

A 2012 special edition Generation 6 Intimidator was also released with multi-colored anodizing and the body surface milled into the shape of flames. This limited release is intended to be a modern incarnation of the ultra rare flame milled Intimidators of generations past, of which only two are known to exist.

Operation 
Like other open bolt, poppet-valve-based markers, the Intimidator uses a solenoid to drive a pneumatic ram into a poppet valve, which causes it to open, firing the paintball. On earlier Intimidators, a recognizable external feature was a dual low-pressure chamber.

References

External links 
Bob Long Technologies 

Paintball markers